is a Japanese light novel series, written by Tone Kōken and illustrated by Hiro. Originally serialized online as a web novel on Kakuyomu from March 2016 to December 2021, Kadokawa Shoten have released eight volumes and one reserve volume from  May 2017 to April 2022 under their Kadokawa Sneaker Bunko label. A manga adaptation with art by Kanitan has been serialized online since December 2017 via Kadokawa Shoten's Comic Newtype manga website. It has been collected in seven tankōbon volumes. 

An anime television series adaptation by Studio Kai aired from April to June 2021 on multiple television networks across Japan and on Crunchyroll internationally. The anime adaptation has received generally positive reviews.

Overview
The series is set in the Mukawa area of Hokuto in Yamanashi Prefecture, Japan. The story follows Koguma, a lone, gruff girl with no hobbies or interests. After an encounter with a Honda Super Cub 50, she begins to grow and her world expands beyond herself. The novel promotional posters and the official novel site promote the commemoration of 100 million units sold for the Honda Super Cub.

Plot
The main character is Koguma, a girl without parents, hobbies, or friends. While riding her city bike to school one day, Koguma decides she'd like to get a motorized bike of some sort. She then resolves to get a Honda Super Cub from a local dealer. Because of this, she eventually makes friends with Reiko and Eniwa.

Characters

The main character. Koguma is a junior in high school in Hokuto, of medium build with short, black hair and plain features, and she gets average grades in school. Her father died when she was very young, and her mother disappeared when Koguma entered high school. As she doesn't have any relatives, she relies on a stipend for living and school expenses, and she lives by herself in an apartment building in front of Hinoharu Station. 
She doesn't have any hobbies or any friends in school, where she pretty much disappears into the background in class. When she buys a Super Cub to use to commute to school, her life begins to change little by little. Because of her isolation, she has a very brusque way of speaking with others. Her name literally translates as "little bear cub". Her full name has yet to be mentioned in the story, and she prefers to be called by her first name. Starting from the seventh light novel volume, she goes to a university in Tokyo.

In the same class as Koguma, Reiko is tall, with long, black hair and a sense of style. Her father is a city councilman, her mother manages a catering business in Hachiōji, and they both live in Tokyo. Reiko lives by herself in a log house the Mukawa area of Hokuto, an area with many vacation homes. Her appearance is very reserved and beautiful, in contrast to Koguma's. She does very well in school and is good at sports. 
Despite standing out a lot in their class, Reiko shows no interest in anything but Cubs. After seeing Koguma going out for lunch and all over on her Cub, she began forming a friendship with her. She is considered an extremely knowledgeable enthusiast regarding Cubs, and is very good at modifying them. She has a vast collection of option parts for Cubs at her log house to make sure she always has them on hand, and also has connections for sourcing parts for Cubs. While her favorite Cub is a restored MD90, it was wrecked during her second year summer vacation to Mount Fuji, and she subsequently acquired a CT110.

A classmate of Koguma and Reiko, she was in charge of the annual cultural festival. She has medium-length hair that is depicted as pale bluish-gray in images from the novels and manga, but grayish in the anime. While Hiro illustrates her with a mole under her right eye, Kanitan omits this in his illustrations for the manga. She's slightly shorter than Koguma, and hasn't changed in height since junior high school. 
After Koguma and Reiko helped her out of a pinch during the cultural festival by using their Cubs, their Cubs piqued her interest and she's hung out with them ever since. Her house is about halfway on Reiko's route to school. Her parents run a German-style bakery and coffee shop named BEURRE (literally "butter" in French). She plans to open a shop when she grows up, and she studies hard to learn how to be a barista. She saved money so she could buy a used espresso machine to help her learn and start her own business. 
Due to an accident during the winter of her junior year, where Koguma rescued her from a fall into a river, she gained great affection for Koguma and her Cub. She rode an Alex Moulton bike until the river accident, after which she purchased a light blue Little Cub.

Media

Web serialization
Super Cub was originally serialized online as a web novel on Kakuyomu from March 2016 to December 2021, before being picked up for publication as light novels by Kadokawa beginning in May 2017.

Light novels

Manga
A manga adaptation with art by Kanitan has been serialized online since December 2017 via Kadokawa Shoten's Comic Newtype manga website. It has been collected in seven tankōbon volumes.

Super Cub Rei
A spin-off manga by Sakae Saito, titled Super Cub Rei, began serialization on the Comic Newtype website on April 29, 2022. The manga focuses on the character Reiko years before she met Koguma and Shii.

Anime
An anime adaptation by Studio Kai was announced on November 20, 2019. The series was directed by Toshiro Fujii, with Toshizō Nemoto handling series composition, Tōru Imanishi designing the characters, and Tomohisa Ishikawa and ZAQ composing the music. It aired from April 7 to June 23, 2021 on AT-X, Tokyo MX, TV Aichi, KBS Kyoto, and BS11. The opening theme song, was performed by Akane Kumada, while the ending theme song, was performed by the main cast members Yuki Yomichi, Ayaka Nanase, and Natsumi Hioka. The series ran for 12 episodes. Funimation licensed the series, releasing new episodes on Wednesdays.

A Blu-ray box set containing all 12 episodes in the series was released in Japan on August 25, 2021. A Blu-ray collection with both the original Japanese audio and an English dub was released in North America by Funimation on May 31, 2022.

Episode list

Reception
The Asahi Shimbun described the first novel as a realistic story told with simple and honest language, showing the changes in the life of Koguma as she expands and explores the world opened up to her after she buys the Super Cub.

The anime series received generally positive reviews. Briana Lawrence at The Mary Sue described the first five episodes as "a warm hug delivered at 20 MPH", praising the series for its celebrations of small victories in the life of Koguma and how those change the character's outlook on life. At Anime News Network, Mercedez Clewis called it "the anime to watch this year", going on to call the first episode "a masterpiece of a premiere", full of "a lot of truly beautiful moments where...[the art and colors]...come together to make really striking, evocative scenes".

Another Anime Review was mixed regarding the setup of the series. While praising the beautiful animation, they complained about possibly "lazy writing and/or sloppy production" due to Koguma's living situation. However, they praised the overarching plot of Koguma finding her world opening up due to her purchase of the Super Cub bike, ending with "There's a lot to love here, folks." In his review for Motor Biscuit, a motorcycle enthusiast website, Matthew Skwarczek praised the details showing Koguma learning how to use and take care of her bike, stating the "show gets motorcycle riders".

See also
Akebi's Sailor Uniform, a manga series written and illustrated by Hiro
Katana Maidens: Toji No Miko, an anime television series, whose manga adaptation was written and illustrated by Sakae Saito

Notes

References

External links
  
  
  
  
 

2017 Japanese novels
2021 anime television series debuts
Anime and manga based on light novels
AT-X (TV network) original programming
Funimation
Honda
Japanese webcomics
Kadokawa Dwango franchises
Kadokawa Shoten manga
Kadokawa Sneaker Bunko
Light novels
Light novels first published online
Motorsports in anime and manga
Muse Communication
Novels set in Yamanashi Prefecture
Seinen manga
Slice of life anime and manga
Studio Kai
Webcomics in print